Joseph Benjamin Prince (April 29, 1855 – October 25, 1920) was a farmer, rancher and political figure in Saskatchewan, Canada. He represented Battleford in the Legislative Assembly of the Northwest Territories from 1898 to 1905 as an Independent. Prince sat as a Liberal for Saskatchewan division in the Senate of Canada from 1909 to 1920 following his appointment by Sir Wilfrid Laurier.

He was born in St-Grégoire, Canada East, the son of Benjamin Prince and Louise Bourdage. He worked with a surveying corps for a time, then went to Winnipeg with his brother. He later moved further west to Battleford. Prince built the first sawmill there and, with a partner, the first flour mill. He also raised livestock and opened a department store in Battleford in 1898. In 1887, he married Ernestine Brassard. Prince served in the Home Guard during the North-West Rebellion. He was mayor of Battleford from 1907 to 1909. Prince died in office at the age of 65.

His son Paul later served in the Saskatchewan assembly.

References

External links 
 

Liberal Party of Canada senators
Canadian senators from Saskatchewan
Mayors of places in Saskatchewan
Members of the Legislative Assembly of the Northwest Territories
People of the North-West Rebellion
Fransaskois people
1855 births
1920 deaths
People from Centre-du-Québec
People from Battleford